Viscount Waverley, of Westdean in the County of Sussex, is a title in the Peerage of the United Kingdom. It was created on 28 January 1952 for the civil servant and politician Sir John Anderson, who served variously as Governor of Bengal, Member of Parliament, Lord Privy Seal, Home Secretary, Lord President of the Council and Chancellor of the Exchequer.  the title is held by his grandson, the third Viscount, who succeeded his father in 1990. He is one of the ninety elected hereditary peers that remain in the House of Lords after the passing of the House of Lords Act 1999, and sits as a cross-bencher.

Viscounts Waverley (1952)
 John Anderson, 1st Viscount Waverley (1882–1958)
 David Alastair Pearson Anderson, 2nd Viscount Waverley (1911–1990)
 John Desmond Forbes Anderson, 3rd Viscount Waverley (b. 1949)

The heir apparent is the present holder's son Hon. Forbes Alastair Rupert Anderson (b. 1996).

Arms

Notes

References 
Kidd, Charles, Williamson, David (editors). Debrett's Peerage and Baronetage (1990 edition). New York: St Martin's Press, 1990, 

 
Viscountcies in the Peerage of the United Kingdom
Noble titles created in 1952
Noble titles created for UK MPs